Bold Heath is a hamlet and rural area in the civil parish of Bold in St Helens, Merseyside.

Historically part of Lancashire, Bold Heath lies on the A57 road at its junction with the A569.

Bold Heath is the former site of Bold Hall (no longer standing). The original pillars of the gate for the main entrance can still be seen on the grounds of Mersey Valley Golf Club.

External links

Towns and villages in the Metropolitan Borough of St Helens